The 1978 Coupe de France Final was a football match held at Parc des Princes, Paris on May 13, 1978, that saw AS Nancy defeat OGC Nice 1–0 thanks to a goal by Michel Platini.

Match details

Assistant Referees:
Fourth Official:

See also
Coupe de France 1977-78

External links
Coupe de France results at Rec.Sport.Soccer Statistics Foundation
Report on French federation site

Coupe
Coupe de France Finals
Coupe De France Final 1978
Coupe De France Final 1978
Coupe de France Final
Coupe de France Final